Panagiota Tsakiri (born in Drama, Greece on ) is a Greek biathlete and cross-country skier.

Tsakiri competed in the 2006 and 2010 Winter Olympics for Greece. Her best performance was 66th in the 2006 cross-country sprint. She also finished 86th in the biathlon sprint and 85th in the biathlon individual.

As of February 2013, her best performance at the Biathlon World Championships is 102nd, in the 2009 sprint.

As of February 2013, Tsakiri's best performance in the Biathlon World Cup 90th, in the sprint at Pokljuka in 2009/10.

References 

1990 births
Living people
Greek female biathletes
Greek female cross-country skiers
Cross-country skiers at the 2006 Winter Olympics
Cross-country skiers at the 2014 Winter Olympics
Biathletes at the 2010 Winter Olympics
Olympic biathletes of Greece
Sportspeople from Drama, Greece
Olympic cross-country skiers of Greece